João Rebelo (born 20 March 1961 in Aljustrel) is a Portuguese former sport shooter who competed in the 1984 Summer Olympics, in the 1988 Summer Olympics, in the 1992 Summer Olympics, in the 1996 Summer Olympics, in the 2000 Summer Olympics.

References

1961 births
Living people
People from Aljustrel
Portuguese male sport shooters
Trap and double trap shooters
Olympic shooters of Portugal
Shooters at the 1984 Summer Olympics
Shooters at the 1988 Summer Olympics
Shooters at the 1992 Summer Olympics
Shooters at the 1996 Summer Olympics
Shooters at the 2000 Summer Olympics
Sportspeople from Beja District